The 46th Punjabis were an infantry regiment of the British Indian Army. It was raised in 1900, as the 46th (Punjab) Regiment of Bengal Infantry. It was designated as the 46th Punjabis in 1903 and became 10th (Training) Battalion of 16th Punjab Regiment in 1922. In 1943, it was converted into the 16th Punjab Regimental Centre. In 1947, the 16th Punjab Regiment was allocated to the Pakistan Army. In 1956, the 1st, 14th, 15th and 16th Punjab Regimental Centres where amalgamated to form the Punjab Regimental Centre.

History
The regiment was raised by Major GP Ranken at Sialkot in October 1900, as the 46th (Punjab) Regiment of Bengal Infantry. It was composed of Punjabi Muslims, Pathans and Sikhs. In 1901, it was redesignated as the 46th Punjab Infantry. Subsequent to the reforms brought about in the Indian Army by Lord Kitchener in 1903, the regiment's designation was again changed to 46th Punjabis. During the First World War, the regiment initially served on the North West Frontier of India, and took part in the Mohmand Blockade of 1915-16 and in operations against Mahsuds in Waziristan in 1917. Later that year, it moved to Egypt but was not engaged in any fighting.

In 1922, the 46th Punjabis were grouped with the 30th, 31st and 33rd Punjabis, and the 9th Bhopal Infantry to form the 16th Punjab Regiment. The battalion was redesignated as 10th (Training) Battalion of the 16th Punjab Regiment and was permanently based at Multan. During the Second World War, 10/16th Punjab was converted into the 16th Punjab Regimental Centre. In 1947, the 16th Punjab Regiment was allocated to Pakistan Army, and in 1956, it was merged with the 1st, 14th and 15th Punjab Regiments to form the Punjab Regiment. The 16th Punjab Regimental Centre was merged with the 1st, 14th and 15th Punjab Regimental Centres to form the Punjab Regimental Centre. It is based at Mardan.

Genealogy
1900 46th (Punjab) Regiment of Bengal Infantry
1901 46th Punjab Infantry
1903 46th Punjabis
1922 10th (Training) Battalion 16th Punjab Regiment
1943 16th Punjab Regimental Centre
1956 Punjab Regimental Centre

See also
16th Punjab Regiment
Punjab Regiment

References

Further reading
Lawford, Lt Col JP, and Catto, Maj WE. (1967). Solah Punjab: The History of the 16th Punjab Regiment. Aldershot: Gale & Polden.
Lawford, James. (1972). 30th Punjabis. London: Osprey.
Rizvi, Brig SHA. (1984). Veteran Campaigners – A History of the Punjab Regiment 1759-1981. Lahore: Wajidalis.

External links
The Indian Army 1900-1939 

British Indian Army infantry regiments
Punjab Regiment (Pakistan)
Military units and formations established in 1900